Triatoma carrioni is a blood-sucking bug and probable vector of the flagellate protozoan that causes Chagas disease. It was discovered by F. Larrousse in 1926.

Type: National Museum of Natural History, Smithsonian Institution, Washington DC.

Paratype M: FIOCRUZ, Rio de Janeiro.

Type locality: Loja Province, Ecuador.

Distribution: South Ecuador, North Peru.

Biology: silvatic, rodent nests and opossum lodges; also peridomestic, and occasionally in houses.

References 

Insect vectors of human pathogens
Reduviidae
Hemiptera of South America